Aspinal of London is a British designer, manufacturer and retailer of luxury leather goods and accessories, founded in London in 2000 by Iain Burton.
It was a supplier of leather accessories to the gift shops of museums such as the National Gallery, the Louvre and the Vatican until launching their first store in 2007.

Stores

London

Regent Street St James's
Royal Exchange
Harrods
Selfridges
Heathrow Terminal 5

United Kingdom

Selfridges – Trafford
House of Fraser – Guildford
Head Office – West Sussex

International

The Galleria – Abu Dhabi
Yas Mall – Abu Dhabi
L+Mall – Shanghai
in99 Mall – Chengdu

History

In 2007, the brand launched its first handbag titled The Paris Bag. Aspinal also opened its first retail location in Selfridges London.

In 2010, Aspinal collaborated with British actress Elizabeth Hurley to create the Elizabeth Hurley Bag in support of the Breast Cancer Research Foundation. For every purchase of the collaboration handbag, Aspinal donated £100 to the BCRF. In the same year, the brand opened the brand's first flagship store on Brook Street, Mayfair London.

Aspinal first ventured internationally in 2013, launching the Middle East with a franchise store in Kuwait, followed by two stores in Abu Dhabi.  The brand's fourth Middle Eastern franchise store opened in the Dubai Mall in 2018.

Still in 2013, Aspinal of London opened a concession in Harrods department store, in Knightsbridge London.

In August 2020, the Aspinal's concession moved to a larger 1300 square foot double boutique within the newly developed Arcade, created to be the destination for luxury gifting within Harrods.

The Duchess of Cambridge first carried the Aspinal of London Midi Mayfair bag in 2013, and has since carried the bag on several occasions in both Black and Lilac colourways. Most recently in January 2020 during an official royal engagement in the city of Bradford, the Duchess of Cambridge paired the Midi Mayfair in Black croc with a khaki Alexander McQueen coat.

In 2015, Aspinal of London collaborated with luxury womenswear brand Beulah to create an exclusive Beulah x Aspinal of London Clutch in support of the United Nations Blue Heart Campaign. For every purchase of the Beulah Clutch, Aspinal donated 25% of the profits to the UN Blue Heart Campaign. The Duchess of Cambridge has carried the Beulah x Aspinal of London Clutch on several occasions.

In 2016, Aspinal collaborated with Chinese actress and singer Yang Mi., launching a limited-edition collection of Trunk Clutch bags titled the ‘Yang Mi Bag’. The collaboration was in support of the One Foundation, a charity founded by Jet Li to promote the development of China's public welfare. For every Yang Mi bag sold, 900 RMB was donated to the One Foundation.

Aspinal of London collaborated with British actress Michelle Dockery in 2016, launching the Dockery bag.

In 2017, Aspinal opened its second and largest flagship store, a 3500 square foot retail space on Regent Street St James's, Mayfair London.

Aspinal joined forces with British supermodel David Gandy in 2018 to launch a collaboration capsule which takes the Spitfires flown by RAF fighter pilots in WWII. Titled the Aerodrome collection, the capsule consisted of men's leather backpacks, business bags and travel accessories.

Giles Deacon first came on board to collaborate with Aspinal of London in 2018, launching the Giles x Aspinal collection of handbags featuring bespoke illustrations by Deacon. Following the success of the collaboration collection, Aspinal appointed Deacon as Design Director to work alongside Mariya Dykalo on shaping future collections for the brand.

2018 saw further international brand growth into the U.S. market, launching Aspinal's first wholesale partnership with Barneys New York. Further overseas growth followed within Europe with the launch of a successful 3-month pop-up store in Galeries Lafayette, Paris.

In November 2019, Aspinal of London opened its first store in Shanghai within L+; a mall in the Pudong financial district turned fashion hub. The Shanghai store is inspired by the UK flagship in London's Regent Street St James's, encapsulating Aspinal's English heritage brand signatures.

Aspinal is the sponsor of the Midhurst Town Cup polo competition, which is a local Polo match played at Cowdray Polo Club, the home of British Polo. Prior to her wedding, a Kate Middleton "Princess Catherine Engagement Doll" was sold, which came with a toy Aspinal bag as an accessory.

References

External links
 Aspinal of London

2000 establishments in England
Clothing brands of the United Kingdom
Companies based in West Sussex
English brands
Fashion accessory brands
High fashion brands
Leather manufacturers
Retail companies established in 2000